The Second Saionji Cabinet is the 14th Cabinet of Japan led by Saionji Kinmochi from August 30, 1911, to December 21, 1912.

Cabinet

References 

Cabinet of Japan
1911 establishments in Japan
Cabinets established in 1911
Cabinets disestablished in 1912